Herb Kreling (born July 10, 1955) is a former Ottawa City Councillor representing Orléans Ward. He was first elected as a regional councillor for the Regional Municipality of Ottawa-Carleton in the 1994 election, and was re-elected to that position in 1997. He was elected to city council in 2000 and was re-elected in the 2003 Ottawa election. He was the chair of the Ottawa Police Services Board. He is a graduate of the University of Windsor. Kreling applied to become a provincial Justice of the Peace in 2005, and was recommended for the position, resulting in his resignation from City Council in September 2005. 

Ottawa city councillors
Living people
1955 births
Ottawa-Carleton regional councillors